Dave Raun (born June 7, 1970) a resident of Fresno, California, is the drummer for the seminal California punk rock band Lagwagon. He also filled in on drums for a short period for Sean "SC" Sellers of Good Riddance. Additionally, Raun drums for the punk rock cover band/supergroup Me First and the Gimme Gimmes, with fellow Lagwagon member Joey Cape. Me First and the Gimme Gimmes also features
members of NOFX, Swingin' Utters, and Foo Fighters. Raun, a native of San Mateo, California, began his career in the mid to late '80's drumming in numerous bands before joining California hardcore punk band Rich Kids on LSD in 1992. Raun joined Lagwagon in 1996, replacing original drummer Derrick Plourde. Most recently, he has been seen drumming for Hot Water Music and Black President. Raun is married to Laura Slippy.

References

External links

 
 

1970 births
Living people
American punk rock drummers
American male drummers
Musicians from Fresno, California
Me First and the Gimme Gimmes members
Good Riddance (band) members
American rock drummers
Lagwagon members
Rich Kids on LSD members
20th-century American drummers
21st-century American drummers